The Isabela Provincial Board is the Sangguniang Panlalawigan (provincial legislature) of the Philippine province of Isabela.

The members are elected via plurality-at-large voting: the province is divided into six districts, each having two seats. A voter votes up to two names, with the top two candidates per district being elected. The vice governor is the ex officio presiding officer, and only votes to break ties. The vice governor is elected via the plurality voting system province-wide.

The districts used in appropriation of members is coextensive with the legislative districts of Isabela, with the exception that Santiago, an independent component city, is excluded in the fourth district.

Aside from the regular members, the board also includes the provincial federation presidents of the Liga ng mga Barangay (ABC, from its old name "Association of Barangay Captains"), the Sangguniang Kabataan (SK, youth councils) and the Philippine Councilors League (PCL). Isabela's provincial board also has reserved seats for the sectoral representatives for women, labor, and indigenous people.

Apportionment

List of members

Current members 
These are the members after the 2019 local elections and 2018 barangay and SK elections:

 Vice Governor: Faustino Dy III (PDP–Laban)

References 

Politics of Isabela (province)
Provincial boards in the Philippines